Serbay Yagiz (born 19 August 1991) is a Turkish professional footballer who plays as a winger for Kahramanmaraşspor.

References

External links

1991 births
Living people
Turkish footballers
Association football midfielders
Konyaspor footballers
1922 Konyaspor footballers
Tokatspor footballers
Hatayspor footballers
Kahramanmaraşspor footballers